5 (FIVE) is the fifth album by the Japanese girl group Berryz Kobo, released on September 10, 2008 in Japan and September 17, 2008 in South Korea. It was released both as a normal edition, with only the CD, and a limited edition, with a DVD included.

This album features three of their previous singles: "Tsukiatteru no ni Kataomoi" (15th), "Dschinghis Khan" (16th), and "Yuke Yuke Monkey Dance" (17th). It reached a peak of #11 on the Oricon weekly chart.

Track listings

CD
 HAPPY Stand Up!
 
 Performed by Momoko Tsugunaga, Chinami Tokunaga and Maasa Sudou
 
 Performed by Saki Shimizu, Miyabi Natsuyaki, Yurina Kumai and Risako Sugaya
 
 Ah Merry-go-round
 Performed by Shimizu Saki and Tsugunaga Momoko 
 CLAP!
 Performed by Tokunaga Chinami, Natsuyaki Miyabi and Kumai Yurina
 REAL LOVE
 Performed by Risako Sugaya
 
 
 
 BE

DVD

Charts

References

External links
5 (FIVE) at the Up-Front Works discography

Berryz Kobo albums
2008 albums